A presidential primary for the Democratic Party was held in Texas in 2004 as part of the selection process for the Democratic candidate for the presidential elections that year.

Results

See also
 2004 Texas Republican presidential primary
 2004 Democratic Party presidential primaries
 2004 United States presidential election in Texas

References

Texas
Democratic primary
2004